Philip Reis may refer to:
Philip Reis (footballer), Hong Kong international footballer in 19 May incident
Johann Philipp Reis, also known as Philip Reis, German scientist and inventor